Moälven (or Själevadsån) is a river in Örnsköldsvik Municipality, Västernorrland County, Sweden.

See also 
 Moälven (ship)

References

Rivers of Västernorrland County